The Circuit was an African-American newspaper published in Catlett, Virginia from 1937 until 1954.  It was described as "Virginia's only colored paper north of Richmond."  The Circuit was important to the African American communities in northern Virginia during the Jim Crow era.

, only ten issues are known to still exist in archives, five at the Library of Virginia and six at the archives of the Afro-American Historical Association of Fauquier County (AAHAFC) in The Plains, Virginia.  Information published in those available copies was important in documenting the historic nature of some African-American communities such as the Ashville Historic District.

References

Defunct African-American newspapers
Newspapers established in 1937
Publications disestablished in 1954
Defunct newspapers published in Virginia
Fauquier County, Virginia